Robert John (born Robert John Pedrick, Jr., January 3, 1946) is an American singer perhaps best known for his 1979 hit single, "Sad Eyes", which reached number 1 on the US Billboard Hot 100.

Biography
John was born in Brooklyn, New York City. Under the name of Bobby Pedrick, Jr., he first hit the pop chart in 1958 when he was only 12 years old with "White Bucks and Saddle Shoes", written by Doc Pomus and Mort Shuman. As the lead singer of Bobby & The Consoles, he had the minor 1963 hit entitled "My Jelly Bean" on Diamond Records. By 1965, he had changed his name and signed with MGM Records for two ill-fated singles. In 1967, he signed a contract with Columbia Records and released a string of singles with help from writing partner Mike Gately.

After a short tenure from 1970 to 1971 with Herb Alpert's A&M Records, 1971 brought his next hit, a cover version of The Tokens' 1961 hit, "The Lion Sleeps Tonight", which climbed to number 3 on the Billboard Hot 100 in 1972, selling over one million copies and receiving a gold disc awarded by the Recording Industry Association of America on March 15, 1972. John also wrote the track "I Can't Move No Mountains" for jazz rock band Blood, Sweat and Tears, released on their 1972 album New Blood. The song was eventually released as a single but did not chart. Several years later, while working in construction in Long Branch, NJ, John was approached by George Tobin, a record producer and songwriter based in California, who wanted to produce a record for John. Tobin recalled in Fred Bronson's The Billboard Book of #1 Hits: "I had him come out and he lived in my house. He was actually a laborer in New Jersey at the time, carrying bricks on a construction job. I was looking for material for him and I heard a song called 'My Angel Baby' (by Toby Beau) and said, 'That's the kind of song Robert should be doing.' So we used that as a frame of reference. Robert wrote 'Sad Eyes' and rewrote it for about 3 months. Every time he'd write it I'd go, 'Nah, change this and change that.' Eventually signing with EMI America Records, John hit #1 with "Sad Eyes", in 1979.

John recorded for Arista Records with guitarist Bobby Mancari and keyboardist Steve Butera, as well as Bread and Butter on Motown in 1984. A re-recorded version of "The Lion Sleeps Tonight" was released on his 1992 greatest hits album.

John, who has not performed often in recent decades, received a chance to appear in his hometown of New York as part of a "70s Reunion Concert" produced by radio station WPLJ-FM on March 24, 1995.  Among the acts who took the stage at the sold-out concert were Three Dog Night, Rupert Holmes, Looking Glass featuring Elliot Lurie, Andrew Gold, Alan O'Day, Ian Lloyd (lead singer of Stories), Sonny Geraci (lead singer of the Outsiders and Climax), and John.

John is largely retired from music, but lives in Las Vegas, Nevada with his wife Diane Pedrick. They have two grown sons, Thomas Pedrick and Matthew Pedrick.

Select discography

Albums
1968: If You Don't Want My Love
1971: On the Way Up
1979: Robert John – US No. 68, CAN No. 81
1980: Back on the Street – US No. 205

Singles

*"Greased Lightning" – peaked at No. 60 on the US Dance chart
Source:

References

External links
[ Allmusic entry]
 

1946 births
Living people
American male singer-songwriters
American tenors
Singer-songwriters from New York (state)
Atlantic Records artists
Musicians from Brooklyn